Chhaya Vora is a veteran TV and film actress. Her works are predominantly present in Hindi and Gujarati film industries. She is the daughter-in-law of famous Gujarati instrumentalist Vinayakrai Vora. Vora started her career with Gujarati theatre in late 1980s.

Career 
Vora started her career as a Gujarati theatre artist in 1986. She got her first break in Gujarati Movie Mijaaj(2018). Her next project was Chitkar (2018). Her last release was Gujarati film Chabutro(2022). She got to play mother of Gangubai in biographical movie directed by Sanjay Leela Bhanshali starring Alia Bhatt as the titular character. She acted in the Indian soap opera Shubharambh as the main cast.

References 

Year of birth missing (living people)
Living people
Indian television actresses
Indian film actresses
21st-century Indian actresses